Ajinomoto Field Nishigaoka (味の素フィールド西が丘), originally called Nishigaoka Soccer Stadium (国立西が丘サッカー場, Nishigaoka National Soccer Stadium), is a football stadium in Kita, Tokyo. It was renamed on 1 May 2012 after the naming rights by Ajinomoto expired after five years.

The stadium is named for Japan Institute of Sports Sciences, which administers it, and is not actually the national stadium; that role is taken by the Tokyo National Stadium in Shinjuku.
 
The Ajinomoto Field Nishigaoka current capacity is 7,137   and is the home stadium of J3 League club FC Tokyo U-23.

Also, some matches hosted at the stadium involve Japanese youth national teams. Occasionally the stadium hosted Tokyo Verdy's J2 League matches.

Transportation
Access to the stadium is from Motohasunuma Station on the Toei Mita Line.

References

External links

 Official website
 FC Tokyo stadium page

Football venues in Japan
Sports venues in Tokyo
Multi-purpose stadiums in Japan
Kita, Tokyo
Sports venues completed in 1972
1972 establishments in Japan